Mudryona (formerly Dzerzhynska) is a station of the Kryvyi Rih Metrotram. 

The station was originally opened on 26 December 1986 as a reversing loop at the end of the first 8 km long segment of the metrotram. The present structure was opened in 1988, however as the second stage, due to technical problems, could not open at once, two three-car shuttles were in use on each track between the ring and Budynok Rad station. In 1989, after the opening of the second stage and the ring at Kiltseva, the shuttle service was discontinued, and the use of the ring with its platform at this station was discontinued, although both were retained for emergency use. 

The station is located in a rather exotic location: the closest street opened to regular traffic is about 15-minute walk through a housing sector. Moreover, the station only 200 meters away from a slime settling reservoir (the track of the tram pass along its dam). Nearby is a railroad station Mudryona, which only serves suburban trains to Piatykhatky. Because of this the station has the lowest passenger traffic in the system.

The construction of the station is just as unique as its location, it is located on the portal of the prolonged tunnel that passes under the city center, as a result its rotunda vestibule is located on the upper level (on top of the portal) and passengers have to descend onto the platforms, which are also located on ground level. The station presents a long stretched concrete vault with a row of supports and two side platforms. There is a series of glazed crowns that provide natural lighting at daytime and additional natural lighting comes from the glazed openings at the base of the vault between the supports.

External links
 Mir Metro - Description and photos
Google maps - Satellite shot.

Kryvyi Rih Metrotram stations